Walking Down is an album by American trombonist Bennie Green, recorded in 1956 and released on the Prestige label.

Reception

The AllMusic review by Scott Yanow awarded the album 4 stars and stated: "The solos are colorful if occasionally stumbling, and the arrangements of the four standards and Green's "East of the Little Big Horn" have their share of surprises."

Track listing
All compositions by Bennie Green except as indicated
 "Walkin'" (credited as "Walking Down") (Richard Carpenter) - 12:00
 "The Things We Did Last Summer (Sammy Cahn, Jule Styne) - 12:19
 "East of the Little Big Horn" (Bennie Green) - 5:36
 "It's You or No One" (Cahn, Styne) - 5:44
 "But Not for Me" (George Gershwin, Ira Gershwin) - 5:20
Recorded at Rudy Van Gelder Studio, Hackensack, New Jersey on June 29, 1956.

Personnel
Bennie Green - trombone
Eric Dixon - tenor saxophone
Lloyd Mayers - piano
Sonny Wellesley - bass
Bill English - drums

References 

Prestige Records albums
Bennie Green albums
1956 albums
Albums produced by Bob Weinstock
Albums recorded at Van Gelder Studio